Durjan (also Romanized as Dūrjan and Dowrjen; also known as Darjan) is a village in Kuhsarat Rural District, in the Central District of Minudasht County, Golestan Province, Iran. At the 2006 census, its population was 846, in 206 families.

References 

Populated places in Minudasht County